Labus is an Indomalayan genus of potter wasps. It contains the following species:

 Labus angularis Vecht, 1935
 Labus armatus (Cameron, 1900)
 Labus bekilyensis Giordani Soika, 1941  
 Labus clypeatus Vecht, 1935
 Labus crassinoda (Cameron, 1910)
 Labus humbertianus Saussure, 1867
 Labus lofuensis Giordani Soika, 1973  
 Labus madecassus Schulthess, 1907
 Labus maindroni Buysson, 1906
 Labus philippinensis Giordani Soika, 1968
 Labus postpetiolatus Gusenleitner, 1988
 Labus pusillus Vecht, 1963   
 Labus rufomaculatus Vecht, 1963
 Labus spiniger Saussure, 1867
 Labus sumatrensis Giordani Soika, 1991
 Labus vandervechti Giordani Soika, 1960

References

 Vecht, J.v.d. & J.M. Carpenter. 1990. A Catalogue of the genera of the Vespidae (Hymenoptera). Zoologische Verhandelingen 260: 3 - 62.

Biological pest control wasps
Potter wasps